Kolkata–Azamgarh Weekly Express is an Express train of the Indian Railways connecting  in West Bengal and   in Uttar Pradesh. It is currently being operated with 13137/13138 train numbers on once in week basis.

Service

The 13137/Kolkata–Azamgarh Weekly Express has an average speed of 42 km/hr and covers 789 km in 18 hrs 45 mins. 13138/Azamgarh–Kolkata Weekly Express has an average speed of 40 km/hr and covers 789 km in 19 hrs 45 mins.

Route & Halts 

The important halts of the train are :

Traction

As the route is partially electrified, it is hauled by a Howrah Loco Shed-based WAP-4 locomotive from Kolkata up to  handing over to a Samastipur Diesel Loco Shed-based WDM-3A locomotive power the train for the remainder of the journey until Azamgarh.

Rake sharing & Maintenance 

The train is maintained by the Kolkata Coaching Depot. The same rake is used for 13325/13326 Gurumukhi Superfast Express for one way which is altered by the second rake on the other way.

Coach composition

The train consists of 15 coaches:

 1 AC II Tier
 1 AC III Tier
 5 Sleeper coaches
 7 General
 2 Second-class Luggage/parcel van

References

External links 

 13137/Kolkata - Azamgarh Weekly Express
 13138/Azamgarh - Kolkata Weekly Express

Transport in Kolkata
Rail transport in Uttar Pradesh
Rail transport in Bihar
Rail transport in West Bengal
Express trains in India
Transport in Azamgarh